Season five of Mexico's Next Top Model, the Mexican adaptation of Tyra Banks' America's Next Top Model, aired on Sony Entertainment Television from September to December 2014. The show was once again hosted by Mexican model Jaydy Michel. The panel of the previous season remained largely unchanged, save for the addition of creative director Óscar Madrazo as one of the main judges, with judge Antonio González de Cosío serving as the show's creative director in his place.

The prize package for this season included a cash prize of Mex$300,000, $125,000 worth of Tommy Hilfiger apparel along with an appearance for a presentation in New York Fashion Week, $50,000 worth of Mary Kay cosmetics, a modeling contract with Queta Rojas management, a brand new Volkswagen Tiguan, and an editorial spread in Glamour magazine, replacing the show's previous magazine sponsor, Elle.

The winner of the contest was Vanessa Ponce, 22 years old. She was born in Mexico City, Mexico, represented the city of León in the State of Guanajuato, Mexico.

Cast

Contestants
(Ages stated are at start of contest)

Judges
 Jaydy Michel (host)
 Allan Fis 
 Glenda Reyna 
 Óscar Madrazo

Other cast members
 Antonio González de Cosío - creative director

Episodes

Results

 The contestant was eliminated
 The contestant quit the competition
 The contestant was eliminated but allowed to remain in the competition
 The contestant won the competition
Episode 1 : Sexy Body In Compcard,Commercial Poster Of Pepsodent With Smiling Pose 

Episode 2 : The Phobia

Episode 3 : Fashion Style Around The World,The Personality Of Fashion From Contestant Country With Iconic And Identic Cultural And Pose's

Episode 4 : Be Strong And Dramatic In Kawasaki Motorcycle Television Commercial

Episode 5 :

Episode 6 : Classical Clay-covered Avant garde Art Exhibition In Group And Individual 

Episode 7 : Memorable Magical Tricks 

Episode 8 : Fierce And Beauty In Story Of Ice Queen At The Ice Lake,Ice Queen Motion Video

Episode 9 : Create Of High Fashion In Iceland Places With Goddes Of Iceland Style

Episode 10 : Falling Love With Iceland Fisherman In Capture And Romantic Music Video

Notes

References

External links
 Official Website

Mexico's Next Top Model
2014 Mexican television seasons